Malvastrum coromandelianum, also known as threelobe false mallow, is an annual or perennial herb or shrub native to North and South America. It has been introduced to many other areas of the world including Australia, Africa, and southern and eastern Asia.

References 

coromandelianum